Rohan Bopanna and Ramkumar Ramanathan defeated Ivan Dodig and Marcelo Melo in the final, 7–6(8–6), 6–1 to win the men's doubles tennis title at the 2022 Adelaide International 1.

Máximo González and Fabrice Martin were the reigning champions from when the tournament was last held in 2020, but chose to compete in the ATP Cup instead.

Seeds 
All seeds received a bye into the second round.

Draw

Finals

Top half

Bottom half

References

External links 
Draw

2022 Adelaide International
2022 ATP Tour
Adelaide